Myriopathidae is a family of cnidarians belonging to the order Antipatharia.

Genera:
 Antipathella Brook, 1889
 Apanipathes
 Cupressopathes Opresko, 2001
 Myriopathes Opresko, 2001
 Plumapathes Opresko, 2001
 Tanacetipathes Opresko, 2001

References

 
Antipatharia
Cnidarian families